Asura obsoleta is a moth of the family Erebidae first described by Frederic Moore in 1878. It is found in the Indian state of Sikkim and Borneo.

The forewings are lighter yellow, with a zigzag postmedial line.

References

obsoleta
Moths described in 1878
Moths of Asia